The 2016 Ford EcoBoost 200 was the 23rd and final stock car race of the 2016 NASCAR Camping World Truck Series, the championship 4 race, and the 21st iteration of the event. The race was held on Friday, November 18, 2016, in Homestead, Florida, at Homestead–Miami Speedway, a 1.5-mile (2.4 km) permanent tri-oval shaped speedway. The race took the scheduled 134 laps to complete. William Byron, driving for Kyle Busch Motorsports, made a pass on Tyler Reddick for the lead with 10 laps to go, and earned his 7th career NASCAR Camping World Truck Series win. Kyle Larson mainly dominated the race, leading 76 laps. 

Meanwhile, Johnny Sauter, driving for GMS Racing, would clinch his first NASCAR Camping World Truck Series championship, after finishing in third, behind Reddick.

Background 

Homestead–Miami Speedway is a motor racing track located in Homestead, Florida. The track, which has several configurations, has promoted several series of racing, including NASCAR, the IndyCar Series, the WeatherTech SportsCar Championship series, and the Championship Cup Series.

Since 2002, Homestead–Miami Speedway had hosted the final race of the season in all three of NASCAR's series as Ford Championship Weekend: the NASCAR Cup Series, NASCAR Xfinity Series, and the NASCAR Camping World Truck Series. The races currently have the names Dixie Vodka 400, Contender Boats 250, and Baptist Health 200, respectively.

Entry list 

 (R) denotes rookie driver.
 (i) denotes driver who is ineligible for series driver points.
 (CC) denotes championship contender.

Practice

First practice 
The first practice session was held on Friday, November 18, at 8:30 am EST, and would last for 1 hour.

Final practice 
The final practice session was held on Friday, November 18, at 10:30 am EST, and would last for 55 minutes.

Qualifying 
Qualifying was held on Friday, November 18, at 3:45 pm EST. Since Homestead–Miami Speedway is at least 1.5 miles (2.4 km) in length, the qualifying system was a single car, single lap, two round system where in the first round, everyone would set a time to determine positions 13–32. Then, the fastest 12 qualifiers would move on to the second round to determine positions 1–12.

Tommy Joe Martins, Jennifer Jo Cobb, and Norm Benning would fail to qualify.

Full qualifying results

Race results

Standings after the race 

Drivers' Championship standings

Note: Only the first 8 positions are included for the driver standings.

References 

NASCAR races at Homestead-Miami Speedway
November 2016 sports events in the United States
2016 in sports in Florida